Asclepain is an enzyme. This enzyme catalyses the following chemical reaction

 Similar to that of papain

This enzyme is isolated from the latex of milkweed, Asclepias syriaca.

References

External links 
 

EC 3.4.22